KARMEN (KArlsruhe Rutherford Medium Energy Neutrino experiment), a detector associated with the ISIS synchrotron at the Rutherford Appleton Laboratory. Neutrinos for study are supplied via the decay of pions produced when a proton beam strikes a target.  It operated from 1990 until March 2001, observing the appearance and disappearance of electron neutrinos.  KARMEN searched for neutrino oscillations, with implications for the existence of sterile neutrinos.

Results 
Limits were set on neutrino oscillation parameters.  The KARMEN results disagreed with the LSND experiment and were followed up by MiniBooNE.

References

External links
KARMEN: Official project homepage, including a list of papers discussing the time anomaly and its possible interpretations.

Accelerator neutrino experiments
Nuclear research institutes in the United Kingdom
Research institutes in Oxfordshire
Science and Technology Facilities Council
Vale of White Horse